The Football League North and Football League South divisions of the Football League were created temporarily for the League to continue through the Second World War while limiting the amount of movement that was required by teams. The leagues started in 1940; however there was only one full season, in 1945–46.  Previous seasons were, in a sense, bit-part leagues with clubs only playing teams that were generally local. An example of this is that in the 1942 Football League North Leeds United played Middlesbrough, Gateshead, Newcastle United, Doncaster Rovers, Sunderland, Bradford Park Avenue, York City, Halifax Town and Huddersfield Town, which they played Home and Away in succession.

The two leagues consisted of all the members of The First and Second Divisions of the Football League split on a purely geographical basis. The 1945–46 full season was instituted as a precursor to the resumption of the previous divisional split in force prior to World War II. As the war had only just finished travel was sometimes difficult to arrange, many of the players were still away and the teams often included guests.

Sheffield United were the Champions of League North and Birmingham City were the Champions of League South for the only full season in 1945–46.

Results and players' contributions do not tend to be included in official statistics.

1945–46 season

North league table

South league table

Notes

Wartime association football
North and South
1